Kriegella is a Gram-negative, aerobic and heterotrophic genus of bacteria from the family of Flavobacteriaceae with one known species (Kriegella aquimaris). Kriegella is named after the American microbiologist Noel R. Krieg.

References

Flavobacteria
Bacteria genera
Monotypic bacteria genera
Taxa described in 2008